Ocean Butterflies Music is an independent Asian music and entertainment company specializing in Chinese-Pop (C-pop).  Founded in 1986, it operates in six regions: Mainland China, Taiwan, Hong Kong, Singapore, Malaysia and United States.

History
In 1986, Ocean Butterflies was founded in Singapore as Ocean Butterflies Production Pte Ltd. In 1990, Ocean Butterflies expanded into music production and in record and singles production for artists from Taiwan, Hong Kong and Malaysia. In 2007, International Data Group, Susquehanna International Group & Accel Partners invested in the company to set up Ocean Butterflies International.It was acquired by Taihe Music Group.  Billy Koh quit as chief executive officer of Ocean Butterflies 2014 to set up Amusic Rights Management, an international music company.

Enterprises
Ocean Butterflies International comprises 5 major enterprises
 Ocean Butterflies Music: music label, artiste management, music production, concert organizer, marketing and distribution network
 Touch Music Publishing: administrates worldwide songs and songwriters
 Ocean Butterflies Technology: on-line, mobile digital music platform, digital/mobile distribution and licensing network.
 Music Forest: music schools and artist training in C-pop market in Singapore, Malaysia and mainland China.
 Ocean Butterflies Communications: product branding, marketing and event organization

Touch Music Publishing
Touch Music Publishing handles the administration and licensing of songs for Ocean Butterflies Music. In 2011 Touch Music Publishing began licensing production music outside of its pop music catalogue. Touch Music Publishing is a member of MPS and Composers & Authors Society of Singapore.

Current roster

 Stella Seah (aka Hui Xian)

External links
Touch Music Publishing a member of MPS

References

Pop record labels
Singaporean independent record labels
Hong Kong independent record labels
Record labels established in 1986
Chinese independent record labels
Companies based in Beijing
Singaporean companies established in 1986